The 2013 Judo Grand Prix Miami was held in Miami, United States from 15 to 16 June 2013.

Medal summary

Men's events

Women's events

Source Results

Medal table

References

External links
 

2013 IJF World Tour
2013 Judo Grand Prix
Judo
Judo competitions in the United States
Judo